Sharfabad Society is one of the neighbourhoods of Gulshan-e-Iqbal Town in Karachi, Sindh, Pakistan.

There are several ethnic groups in Sharfabad Society including Muhajirs, Punjabis, Sindhis, Kashmiris, Seraikis, Pakhtuns, Balochis, Memons, Bohras,  Ismailis, etc. Over 99% of the population is Muslim. The population of Gulshan-e-Iqbal Town is estimated to be nearly one million.

See also 
 Gulshan-e-Iqbal Town
 Delhi Mercantile Society
 Essa Nagri
 Gulshan-e-Iqbal I
 Gulshan-e-Iqbal II
 Gulzar-e-Hijri
 Gulistan-e-Jauhar
 Jamali Colony
 Metroville Colony
 Pehlwan Goth
 P.I.B. Colony
 Safooran Goth
 Shanti Nagar

References

External links 
 Karachi Website.
 Gulberg Town.

Neighbourhoods of Karachi